The name Hallgeir or Halgeir is a Norse name, dating back to the Viking age. As with most names of the time, Hallgeir has a specific meaning.

The word Hal, or Hall means rock or slate.
The word Geir means spear.

In present day, the name Hallgeir is mostly considered to mean "Spear"

People with the name
Hallgeir Brenden Olympic gold medalist
Hallgeir H. Langeland Norwegian politician

Norwegian masculine given names